Augustine Azuka Okocha (born 14 August 1973), commonly known as Jay-Jay Okocha, is a Nigerian former professional footballer who played as an attacking midfielder. He played 73 times for the Nigeria national team between 1993 and 2006, scoring 14 times, and was a member of three FIFA World Cup squads. He is regarded as one of the greatest football players from Africa.

He played across multiple leagues, starting his career at Enugu Rangers in the Nigerian Professional Football League before moving to Borussia Neunkirchen in Oberliga Südwest, Germany's third division in July 1990. He would play in the Bundesliga, Turkish Süper Lig, French Ligue 1, English Premier League, EFL Championship, and Qatar Stars League before his retirement in 2008.

Club career
Augustine Azuka "Jay-Jay" Okocha was born in Enugu, Enugu State. His parents lived in Iwo local Government, Osun State, Nigeria. The name Jay-Jay was passed down from his elder brother James, who started playing football first; his immediate elder brother, Emmanuel was also called Emma Jay-Jay, but the name stuck with Okocha instead. He began playing football on the streets just like many other football stars, usually with a makeshift ball.

In an interview with BBC Sport he said, "As far as I can remember, we used to play with anything, with any round thing we could find, and whenever we managed to get hold of a ball, that was a bonus! I mean it was amazing!" In 1990, he joined Enugu Rangers. In his time at the club he produced many spectacular displays including one where he rounded off and scored a goal, against experienced Nigerian goalkeeper Willy Okpara in a match against BCC Lions. Later that year, he went on holiday to West Germany, the country that had just won the 1990 FIFA World Cup, so he could watch German league football. His friend Binebi Numa was playing in the Third Division for Borussia Neunkirchen, and one morning Okocha accompanied Numa to training, where he asked to join in. The Neunkirchen coach was impressed with Okocha's skills and invited him back the next day before offering him a contract. A year later, he joined 1. FC Saarbrücken, but stayed only a few months with the 2. Bundesliga side before a move to the Bundesliga with Eintracht Frankfurt.

Eintracht Frankfurt
Okocha joined Eintracht Frankfurt in December 1991, where he linked up with many well-known players including Ghanaian international striker Tony Yeboah and later Thomas Doll. He continued to shine for the German side, one highlight being a goal he scored against Karlsruher SC, dribbling in the penalty box and slotting the ball past goalkeeper Oliver Kahn even going past some players twice. The goal was voted Goal of the Season by many football magazines, and also voted as 1993 Goal of the Year by viewers of Sportschau (an ARD German TV sports programme). In 1995, Okocha, Yeboah and Maurizio Gaudino were all involved in a feud with manager Jupp Heynckes, which led to their departure from the club.

Yeboah and Gaudino later left for England, while Okocha stayed until the end of the season when Frankfurt were relegated to the 2. Bundesliga, before signing for the Istanbul club Fenerbahçe. In the Bundesliga he scored 18 goals in 90 matches.

Fenerbahçe
Okocha joined Turkish club Fenerbahçe for approximately £1 million following Eintracht Frankfurt's relegation to the 2. Bundesliga. In his two seasons with the team, he amassed 30 goals in 62 appearances, many of them coming from direct free kicks, which became something of a trademark for him at the club.

Okocha acquired Turkish citizenship and chose the name Muhammed Yavuz while playing for Fenerbahçe.

Paris Saint-Germain
In 1998, French side Paris Saint-Germain spent around £14 million to sign Okocha, making him the most expensive African player at the time. During his four-year stint with PSG, he played 84 matches and scored 12 goals. He has also served as a mentor, at the time, for young Brazilian footballer Ronaldinho during his time in Paris.

Bolton Wanderers
Okocha joined Bolton Wanderers on a free transfer after leaving PSG in the summer of 2002 after the FIFA World Cup. His debut season, despite being hampered by injuries, made him a favourite with the Bolton fans, with the team printing shirts with the inscription "Jay-Jay – so good they named him twice". He steered the team away from relegation with seven goals, including the team Goal of the Season in the vital league win against West Ham United. This was voted Bolton's best Premier League goal in a fans vote in 2008. The next season saw Okocha receive more responsibility as he was given the captain's armband following Guðni Bergsson's retirement. As captain he led Bolton to their first cup final in nine years where they finished runners-up in the 2004 Football League Cup to Middlesbrough.

In 2006, he was stripped of the captaincy – something he said he had seen coming, as there had been a change in attitude from some staff members. This had probably been due to his proposed move to the Middle East, which had been growing in speculation. At the end of the season, he refused a one-year extension in order to move to Qatar.

Following Bolton's relegation from the Premier League in 2012, Okocha stated that his time at the club was now rendered a waste of time, because the club had not invested and improved on the foundations that were laid during his time there.

In 2017, Okocha was voted the best player to have ever played for Bolton Wanderers at the Reebok/Macron Stadium.

Hull City
After just one season in Qatar, Football League Championship side Hull City signed Okocha on a free transfer in 2007, after the player had been linked to Real Salt Lake and Sydney FC. It was a move he made saying that "God had told him to do so". He however was not able to contribute greatly to Hull's promotion campaign due to fitness and constant injury problems, playing only 18 games and scoring no goals. Hull still succeeded in winning promotion to the Premier League, for the first time in their 104-year history. At the end of the season, after changing his mind on a proposed retirement due to Hull's promotion, he was released by the club, which ultimately sent him into retirement.

International career
Okocha made his official debut for Nigeria in their 2–1 1994 FIFA World Cup Qualifier away loss against Ivory Coast in May 1993. It was not until his second cap and home debut that he became a favourite with the Nigerian supporters. With Nigeria trailing 1–0 against Algeria, in a match they needed to win, he scored from a direct free kick to equalise, before helping the team to a 4–1 win, eventually securing qualification to their first World Cup. In 1994, he was a member of both the victorious 1994 African Cup of Nations squad  and the World Cup squad who made it to the second round before they lost in a dramatic match against eventual runners-up Italy.

In 1996, Okocha became a key member of an arguably more successful Nigerian side, their Olympic gold winning side at the Atlanta Games, later nicknamed the Dream Team by the Nigerian press after the USA 1992 Olympic gold winning basketball team. In the 1998 FIFA World Cup hosted by France, Okocha played for a disappointing Super Eagles side who failed to live up to expectations again reaching the round of 16, albeit with less impressive performances save for their 3–2 opening win against Spain. This did not destroy interest in Okocha, who had entertained fans with his trademark skills and dribbles and went on to be named in the squad of the tournament.

Okocha again joined the Super Eagles in the 2000 African Cup of Nations co-hosted with Ghana. He scored three goals in the tournament, two in the opening game against Tunisia, and then given a standing ovation by the nearly 60,000 attendance when he left the field.

He made a return to the Super Eagles in his testimonial against an African select side in Warri. The game featured former players Daniel Amokachi, Alloysius Agu, John Fashanu, Benjani and Sulley Muntari. Nigeria won the game 2–1 with Okocha scoring the winning goal after appearing for the side in the second half. In March 2004, he was named one of the top 125 living footballers by Pelé.

Style of play
A quick, talented, and skilful playmaker, Okocha usually played as an attacking midfielder, and is widely considered by certain pundits internationally as the best Nigerian footballer ever, and as one of the best African players of all time. He is still remembered by Fenerbahçe fans as one of the legends of the club and country. Okocha was known for his confidence and trickery with the ball, technique, creativity, flair, close control, and dribbling skills, as well as his turn of pace and his use of feints, in particular the stepover and his trademark turns. Due to his skill and nickname, he was described as being 'so good that they named him twice' (a line immortalised in a terrace chant while Okocha played for Bolton Wanderers). Despite his ability, however, he was also known for being inconsistent.

Post-playing career
In late 2014 Okocha was added to the FIFA football game series as a "Legend" which honours his years as a great footballer.

On 21 February 2015, Okocha was elected as the Chair of the Delta State Football Association.

In April 2015, Okocha expressed his interest in becoming the Nigeria Football Federation president.

On 15 May 2016, Okocha played in a charity match as part of "Team John McGinlay" against "Team Tony Kelly" at the Macron Stadium and scored a hat-trick in his team's 6–2 win.

In June 2019, it was reported that Okocha had been charged with alleged money laundering in Scotland.

Okocha has served as a football pundit African sports broadcaster, Supersports since 2019, providing analysis for major tournaments, including the African Cup of Nations and the European championships.

On 14 November 2021, Okocha played in a charity match as part of a team of Bolton Wanderers Legends against the current Bolton first team with the match helping to raise money for the Mother of Bolton player Gethin Jones, who had been diagnosed with Motor neuron disease. The Bolton first team won 7–4, with Okocha scoring a penalty for the Legends team.

Personal life
Okocha is from Anioma, a sub-group of the Igbo people. His older brother Emmanuel is also a former footballer who played for the Nigerian national team. He has a nephew, Alex Iwobi, who plays for Everton and Nigeria.

Career statistics

Club

International

Scores and results list Nigeria's goal tally first, score column indicates score after each Okocha goal.

Honours
Borussia Neunkirchen
Saarland Cup: 1989–90, 1991–92
Oberliga Südwest: 1990–91

Fenerbahçe
Prime Minister's Cup: 1998
Atatürk Cup: 1999

Paris Saint-Germain
Trophée des Champions: 1998
UEFA Intertoto Cup: 2001

Bolton Wanderers
Football League Cup runner-up: 2003–04

Hull City
Football League Championship play-offs: 2008

Nigeria U23
Summer Olympic Games: 1996

Nigeria
Africa Cup of Nations: 1994; runner up: 2000; third place: 2002, 2004, 2006
Afro-Asian Cup of Nations: 1995

Individual
Goal of the Year (Germany): 1993
Nigerian Footballer of the Year: 1995, 1997, 2000, 2002, 2003, 2004, 2005; runner-up: 1996
African Footballer of the Year runner-up: 1998; third place: 2003, 2004
FIFA World Cup All-Star Team (Reserve): 1998
BBC African Footballer of the Year: 2003, 2004
BBC Goal of the Month: April 2003
Premier League Player of the Month: November 2003
Africa Cup of Nations Top Scorer: 2004
Africa Cup of Nations Best Player: 2004
Bolton Wanderers Player of the Year: 2004–05
 IFFHS All-time Africa Men's Dream Team: 2021

See also
 Jay Jay Okocha Stadium

References

External links
 
 
 

1973 births
Living people
Igbo sportspeople
Footballers from Enugu
Nigerian footballers
Association football midfielders
Rangers International F.C. players
Borussia Neunkirchen players
Eintracht Frankfurt players
Fenerbahçe S.K. footballers
Paris Saint-Germain F.C. players
Bolton Wanderers F.C. players
Qatar SC players
Hull City A.F.C. players
Bundesliga players
Süper Lig players
Ligue 1 players
Premier League players
Qatar Stars League players
English Football League players
African Footballer of the Year winners
Olympic footballers of Nigeria
Nigeria international footballers
1994 African Cup of Nations players
1994 FIFA World Cup players
1995 King Fahd Cup players
Footballers at the 1996 Summer Olympics
1998 FIFA World Cup players
2000 African Cup of Nations players
2002 African Cup of Nations players
2002 FIFA World Cup players
2004 African Cup of Nations players
2006 Africa Cup of Nations players
Africa Cup of Nations-winning players
Medalists at the 1996 Summer Olympics
Olympic gold medalists for Nigeria
Olympic medalists in football
FIFA 100
Nigerian expatriate footballers
Nigerian expatriate sportspeople in Germany
Nigerian expatriate sportspeople in Turkey
Nigerian expatriate sportspeople in France
Nigerian expatriate sportspeople in England
Nigerian expatriate sportspeople in Qatar
Expatriate footballers in Germany
Expatriate footballers in Turkey
Expatriate footballers in France
Expatriate footballers in England
Expatriate footballers in Qatar
Naturalized citizens of Turkey